Alexander James McPhail (December 23, 1883 – October 21, 1931) was a Scottish-Canadian agricultural reformer, and the first president of the Saskatchewan Wheat Pool. The Canadian government designated him a Person of National Historic Significance in 1971.

Early life

Alexander McPhail was born in Paisley, Ontario, the eldest of eight or nine siblings. In 1902, when he was nineteen, his parents died. He eventually took his homestead West, settling in Bankend, Saskatchewan in 1906.

In 1913, McPhail joined the Saskatchewan Department of Agriculture. There he promoted various political and economic changes for prairie farmers. After the dismissal of P.F. Brendt, because of his German nationality as of tension caused by the Great War, McPhail resigned his position in 1918. Concurrently, he had been enlisted in the military as a member of the domestic militia.

He then became a livestock drover in Elfros, Saskatchewan. During this period he became involved with the Progressive Party of Canada and was a member of the "Ginger Group".

In 1922, he became the Secretary of the Saskatchewan Grain Growers Association, replacing J.B. Musselman. McPhail held this position until his resignation in 1924.

In 1924, McPhail became the first president of the Saskatchewan Wheat Pool, with George Robertson of Wynyard as secretary, after canvassers promoted pooling wheat acquired up more than 50 percent of the acreage in the province. His administration was involved with the purchase of the elevator system owned by the Saskatchewan Co-operative Elevator Co. He would be president until his death in 1931.

He was also instrumental in forming the Central Sales Agency to handle the crops of the three prairie provinces. The Agency, by August 1931, fell into debt, requiring all three provincial pools it balance the dues.

On October 21, 1931, at the age of 47, McPhail died after an operation at the Regina General Hospital.

Political views
McPhail was a firm believer in voluntary marketing, going so far as to campaign against compulsory marketing.

He was in opposition against high salaries for top managers at the Saskatchewan Wheat Pool, stating: "Seven thousand a year should be enough for any man if his heart is in the work".  He, himself, only had a salary of $4,000 a year, comparable to what he could have earned farming.

Legacy

There is a plaque dedicated to McPhail on the Saskatchewan Wheat Pool Building at 2625 Victoria Avenue in Regina, Saskatchewan.

Harold Innis identified himself with McPhail's character. In compiling McPhail's diary, he describes McPhail as having "a strong sense of humour … as well as a hard agnostic bent of mind which resisted emotionalism and made imposition difficult.... He disliked publicity... He read widely, and particularly biography..." In the same work, Innis quotes an uncited source's description of McPhail, who "loathed cynicism, smartness, and pomposity in equal degrees. He admired brains and respected honesty.… It was difficult for him to unbend physically or mentally … no use for cards in any form, or any time-wasting pastimes except conversation".

References

Further reading

External links 

Alexander James McPhail Papers held at the Thomas Fisher Rare Book Library, University of Toronto

1883 births
1931 deaths
19th-century Scottish people
Canadian people of Scottish descent
Persons of National Historic Significance (Canada)